The 1940 All-Ireland Minor Hurling Championship was the 13th staging of the All-Ireland Minor Hurling Championship since its establishment by the Gaelic Athletic Association in 1928.

Cork entered the championship as the defending champions in search of a record fourth successive title, however, they were beaten by Limerick in the Munster semi-final.

On 1 September 1940 Limerick won the championship following a 6-4 to 2-4 defeat of Antrim in the All-Ireland final. This was their first All-Ireland title.

Results

All-Ireland Minor Hurling Championship

Semi-finals

Final

Championship statistics

Miscellaneous

 Dublin defeated Laois by 10-05 to 3-03 to win the Leinster Championship, however, they later forfeited the title after an objection regarding the playing of overage players was upheld by the Leinster Council.
 Antrim qualified for the All-Ireland final for the first and only time in their history.
 Limerick became the fifth team to win the All-Ireland Championship title.

External links
 All-Ireland Minor Hurling Championship: Roll Of Honour

Minor
All-Ireland Minor Hurling Championship